Murashige (written: 村重) is both a Japanese surname and a masculine Japanese given name. Notable people with the name include:

Surname
, Japanese singer and idol
Toshio Murashige, American botanist

Given name
, Japanese samurai

Japanese-language surnames
Japanese masculine given names